Samuel Adebola Ife Oluwa G O Adewusi (born 26 December 1999) is an English professional footballer who plays as a midfielder.

Career
He turned professional with Carlisle United in May 2018, alongside Max Brown and Kieron Olsen. On 1 February 2019, Brown was one of four young professionals to leave Carlisle by mutual consent. He has since played for Wythenshawe Amateurs.

References

1999 births
Living people
English footballers
Carlisle United F.C. players
English Football League players
Association football midfielders
Black British sportspeople
Wythenshawe Amateurs F.C. players